This is a List of newspapers in Chennai that are based  and headquartered in the city. The availability of multimedia news platforms has accelerated in the 21st century, and by the close of 2017, no Chennai newspaper had a monthly circulation below two million readership, making the city one of the most widest newspaper reading city in the world along with the likes of New York, Paris, London, Tokyo and Sydney.

List of newspapers based in Chennai 
The list is the newspapers based in Chennai and their circulation.

 Hello Mirror Madras Daily (Morning) 1,810,989

List of magazines based in Chennai 

The list is the magazines headquartered in Chennai and their circulation.

References 

Companies based in Chennai
Chennai
Mass media in Chennai
Tamil-language newspapers published in India